Neotrichura is a monotypic moth genus in the subfamily Arctiinae erected by Herbert Druce in 1896. Its single species, Neotrichura nigripes, was first described by Franciscus J. M. Heylaerts in 1890. It is found in Panama and the Brazilian states of Paraná and Rio de Janeiro.

References

Arctiinae
Monotypic moth genera